Linda L. Baker (born 1948) is an American schoolteacher and politician from Maine. Baker, a Republican from Topsham, Maine, represented District 23 in the Maine Senate. District 23 encompasses all of Sagadahoc County, Maine and the adjacent town of Dresden.

Baker taught in public schools for 31 years, including 26 at Mount Ararat High School in Topsham. She also spent 8 years on the Topsham Finance Committee and 3 years as a selectwoman on the Topsham Town Council.

Background
In 2014, Baker ran against incumbent State Senator Eloise Vitelli. Vitelli had  beaten former Senator Paula Benoit in a special election the year before. Ultimately, despite being outspent substantially by outside groups, Baker bested Vitelli by 1,036 votes.

As a Senator, Baker serves as Chairwoman of the Joint Standing Committee on Marine Resources - the first Senator from Sagadahoc to chair the committee in decades. She also is a member of the Joint Standing Committee on Insurance and Financial Services. As a first term Senator, Baker proposed a bill to tie legislative pay to attendance. The bill ultimately passed the legislature with widespread bipartisan support and became law without the Governor's signature. Baker also received praise for "noteworthy action" from the Maine League of Conservation Voters for co-sponsoring the bipartisan Kids Safe Products Act which would dealt with toxic chemicals.

In June 2016, Baker faced Guy Lebida of Bowdoin, Maine in the Republican primary for Senate District 23. Lebida, who was endorsed by Republican Governor Paul LePage, bested Baker by just 40 votes of out approximately 2,100 cast. Baker did not request a recount. Lebida was later defeated by Eloise Vitelli by over 1,300 votes.

References

1948 births
Living people
Schoolteachers from Maine
American women educators
People from Topsham, Maine
Maine city council members
Republican Party Maine state senators
Women state legislators in Maine
Women city councillors in Maine
21st-century American women politicians
21st-century American politicians